Western European Summer Time (WEST, UTC+01:00) is a summer daylight saving time scheme, 1 hour ahead of Greenwich Mean Time and Coordinated Universal Time. It is used in:
 the Canary Islands
 Portugal (including Madeira but not the Azores)
 the Faroe Islands

The following countries also use the same time zone for their daylight saving time but use a different title:
United Kingdom, which uses British Summer Time (BST) 
Ireland, which uses Irish Standard Time (IST) ( (ACÉ)). Also sometimes erroneously referred to as  "Irish Summer Time".

The scheme runs from the last Sunday in March to the last Sunday in October each year. At both the start and end of the schemes, clock changes take place at 01:00 UTC+00:00. During the winter, Western European Time (WET, GMT+0 or UTC±00:00) is used.

The start and end dates of the scheme are asymmetrical in terms of daylight hours: the vernal time of year with a similar amount of daylight to late October is mid-February, well before the start of summer time. The asymmetry reflects temperature more than the length of daylight.

Ireland observes Irish Standard Time during the summer months and changes to UTC±00:00 in winter. As Ireland's winter time period begins on the last Sunday in October and finishes on the last Sunday in March, the result is the same as if it observed summer time.

Usage
The following countries and territories use UTC+01:00 during the summer, between 1:00 UTC on the last Sunday of March and 1:00 UTC on the last Sunday of October.

Canary Islands, regularly since 1980 (rest of Spain is CEST, i.e. UTC+02:00)
Faroe Islands, regularly since 1981
 Ireland
 1916–1939 summers IST
 1940–1946 all year IST
 1947–1968 summers IST
 1968–1971 all year IST
 1972– summers IST
 Portugal
 Continental Portugal
 1916–1921 summers WEST
 1924 summer WEST
 1926–1929 summers WEST
 1931–1932 summers WEST
 1934–1941 summers WEST
 1942–1945 summers WEST (1942–1945 midsummers Western European Midsummer Time|WEMT=WEST+1)
 1946–1966 summers WEST
 1966–1976 all year WEST/CET
 1977–1992 summers WEST
 1992–1996 winters WEST/CET (1993–1995 summers CEST)
 1996– summers WEST
 Madeira, regularly since 1982
 The United Kingdom
 1916–1939 summers BST
 1940–1945 all year BST (1941–1945 summers BDST=BST+1)
 1946 summer BST
 1947 summer BST (1947 midsummer BDST=BST+1)
 1948–1968 summers BST
 1968–1971 all year BST
 1972– summers BST

Ireland

In Ireland, since the Standard Time (Amendment) Act, 1971, Ireland has used UTC+1 in summer (officially "standard time", though usually called "summer time") and UTC+0 in winter (officially "winter time").

Portugal

Portugal moved to Central European Time and Central European Summer Time in 1992, but reverted to Western European Time in 1996 after concluding that energy savings were small, it had a disturbing effect on children's sleeping habits as it would not get dark until 22:00 or 22:30 in summer evenings, during winter mornings the sun was still rising at 9:00, with repercussions on standards of learning and school performance, and insurance companies reported a rise in the number of accidents.

United Kingdom

Starting in 1916, the dates for the beginning and end of BST each year were mandated by the Parliament of the United Kingdom. From 1940 to 1945, the country used British Summer Time in the winter months and British Double Summer Time, a further hour ahead of GMT, in the summer months. From 1968 to 1971, the country used BST throughout the year. In February 2002, the Summer Time Order 2002 changed the dates and times to match European rules for moving to and from daylight saving time.

Start and end dates of British Summer Time and Irish Standard Time

Note: Until 1 October 1916 time in all of Ireland was based on Dublin Mean Time, GMT − 25 minutes.

References

Further reading
Prerau, David. Saving the Daylight: Why We Put the Clocks Forward — The Story of Summer Time/Daylight Saving Time with a focus on the UK

External links
A Brief History of BST/DST
History of legal time in Britain
BBC News report: Safety call as clocks go back.
BBC News report: Tundra time call in clocks debate.
UK Government Report: Overview of the pros and cons of British Summer Time.
RoSPA Press Release: RoSPA calls for switch to lighter nights to save lives
BST FAQ
Official British Government site listing Summer time dates for 2006–2011 inclusive (Updated March 2008)
Dates when BST began and ended
UNIX 'zoneinfo' file for Europe: as well as including a full set of dates for all European countries, it includes many comments on the history of DST in those countries.

Time in the United Kingdom

eo:WEST